Piper baezanum is a species of pepper plant in the family Piperaceae. It is endemic to Ecuador.

References

Flora of Ecuador
baezanum
Critically endangered plants
Taxonomy articles created by Polbot